Clarence Rupert Haden Jr. (May 30, 1910 - March 11, 2000) was fourth bishop of the Episcopal Diocese of Northern California, serving from 1958 to 1978. He had served previously as dean of Grace and Holy Trinity Cathedral (Kansas City, Missouri).

References 

1910 births
2000 deaths
20th-century American Episcopalians
Episcopal bishops of Northern California
20th-century American clergy